Baz Gul Afridi is a Pakistani politician and businessman from the Darra Adam Khel region of Pakistan. He served as the Member of National Assembly for the FATA region NA-34 from 1997 to 1999.

Haji Baz Gul comes from an Afridi Pashtun family from the region of Darra Adam Khel in the federally administrated tribal areas of Pakistan. Baz Gul is the brother of former Pakistani Senator Haji Gul Afridi. He is an entrepreneur by profession and prior to entering politics he was active in the Real Estate business throughout Pakistan. He also co-owned Peshawar's largest computer market Gul Haji Plaza.

Baz Gul promoted education, welfare and sports in the FATA region.

Political career
Baz Gul entered politics by running as an independent candidate for the National Assembly of Pakistan during the Pakistan General Elections 1997 and was elected as MNA from NA-34 region of FATA. He served as the MNA for NA-34 FATA until 1999.

Baz Gul was a candidate for National Assembly seat NA-47 in the 2008 General Election. He was third, with 20% of the vote. He contested the same seat in the 2013 General Election, this time as a candidate for the PML-N and was unsuccessful in his campaign.

Baz Gul Afridi announced his resignation from PML-N after parliament passed the FATA merger bill stating that he values the tribal tradition of self determination more than alliance with any party. He is to stand as an independent candidate for NA-51 for the 2018 Pakistan general election.

See also 
 Afridi tribe

References

1952 births
Living people
Pashtun people